Miners Falls is a waterfall located on Miners River in the western portion of the Pictured Rocks National Lakeshore in Alger County, Michigan. The falls can be accessed by a 0.6 mile gravel path, with stairs leading to a lookout.

References
Great Lakes Waterfalls
Pictured Rocks Waterfalls

Protected areas of Alger County, Michigan
Waterfalls of Michigan
Pictured Rocks National Lakeshore
Landforms of Alger County, Michigan